ABWU may refer to:

 All Bengal Women's Union, a non-governmental organization
 Antigua Workers' Union, a national trade union of Antigua and Barbuda